Bobby Pulido is an American Tejano music singer who has won 11 awards against 31 nominations.

Awards and nominations

Lo Nuestro 
Pulido was nominated for one award.

|-
| 1997 || Bobby Pulido || Regional Mexican New Artist of the Year || 
|-
|}

Latin Grammy Awards 

|-
| 2000 || El Cazador || Best Tejano Album || 
|-
| 2004 || Móntame || Best Tejano Album || 
|-
| 2005 || Vive || Best Tejano Album || 
|-
|}
| 2022 || Para Que Baile Mi Pueblo || Best Tejano Album || 
|-
|}

Fiestas Mexican Awards 
Pulido became the youngest recipient to win an Orgullo de la Frontera award in 1999.

|-
| 1999 || Bobby Pulido || Orgullo de la Frontera || 
|-
|}

Tejano Music Awards 
Nominated for 22, Pulido won eight Tejano Music Awards, which are awarded annually in San Antonio, Texas, honoring Tejano acts.

|-
| 1996 || Bobby Pulido || Most Promising Band || 
|-
|rowspan="3"| 1997 || Bobby Pulido || Male Entertainer of the Year || 
|-
| Bobby Pulido || Most Promising Band || 
|-
| Bobby Pulido and Roberto Pulido || Vocal Duo of the Year || 
|-
|rowspan="5"| 1998 || Bobby Pulido || Male Vocalist of the Year || 
|-
| Bobby Pulido || Male Entertainer of the Year || 
|-
| Llegaste A Me Vida || Album of the Year – Group || 
|-
| Bobby Pulido || Crossover of the Year || 
|-
| Bobby Pulido || Music Video of the Year || 
|-
|rowspan="3"| 1999 || Bobby Pulido || Male Vocalist of the Year || 
|-
| Bobby Pulido || Male Entertainer of the Year || 
|-
| "Que Mas Te Puede Dar" || Tejano Crossover Song of the Year || 
|-
| 2000 || Bobby Pulido || Male Entertainer of the Year || 
|-
| 2002 || Bobby Pulido || Male Vocalist of the Year || 
|-
|rowspan="3"| 2003 || Bobby Pulido || Male Vocalist of the Year || 
|-
| "Vanidosa" || Song of the Year || 
|-
| Bobby || Tejano Album of the Year || 
|-
| 2004 || "Vanidosa" || Tejano Crossover Song of the Year || 
|-
|rowspan="3"| 2011 || Bobby Pulido || Male Vocalist of the Year || 
|-
| Bobby Pulido || Entertainer of the Year || 
|-
| "Dias de Ayer" || Song of the Year || 
|-
| 2014 || Bobby Pulido || Male Vocalist of the Year || 
|}

References 

Pulido, Bobby
Tejano music